is an area in Chiyoda, Tokyo, Japan, consisting of the six "-banchō" districts,  to , as well as parts of Kudanminami and Kudankita, and Fuijimi.

The Banchō area is located to the west of the Imperial Palace. 
The historical area is roughly triangular in shape,  forms its southern boundary. 

 runs through its historical boundaries. Present day area with "Banchō" in the districts names stops south of this avenue.

History

Edo period

The area was the location of the residences of the six  groups, the hatamoto samurai in charge of the guard of the Edo castle.

During Edo times the area was very uniform, packed in hatamoto residences resembling each other with no signage, making it difficult for external visitors to find a specific residence. Some shogunate stables, were said to be aligned at the bottom of a slope, giving its name to the slope  in Sanbanchō.

No hatamoto residence subsists to this day in Banchō, there is however a small memorial in front of the entrance of the Nippon Dental University in Fujimi, indicating the location of the residence of the hatamoto Tominaga Kenzaemon, which was marked in a map dating from the Enpo era in the 17th century and whose lineage served until the end of the shogunate.

In 1793, the blind scholar Hanawa Hokiichi founded  in nowadays Yonbanchō, which moved to Omote-Rokubanchō, near nowadays Sanbanchō-24.
As the Shogunate was nearing its end, Omura Masujiro opened in 1856 , a rangaku institute in his residence, located next to nowadays Chidorigafuchi National Cemetery.

Meiji and after
At the Meiji restoration, hatamoto and feudal residences emptying, many Kazoku nobles and high-ranked officials of the newly formed government moved into the area, thanks to its proximity to the palace. Yamagata Aritomo set up a personal residence in 1885 right in front of Chidorigafuchi moat, and used it as his Tokyo residence from 1917, where present day Sanbanchō Kyoyo-Kaigisho stands in Kudanminami.
Tōgō Heihachirō moved to Banchō in 1881 and lived there for 54 years. Other prominent politicians (including several prime ministers), top military officers and businessmen such as Aoki Shuzo, Akiyama Yoshifuru, Wakatsuki Reijiro, Katō Takaaki, Katō Hiroyuki and Kawakami Soroku took their residences in the area.

In 1872, under Sir Harry Smith Parkes, the British legation obtained land on the site of several feudal and hatamoto residences, in modern-day Ichibanchō. The construction of the building was finished in 1874. One of the most prominent actors of the early Anglo-Japanese relations, Sir Ernest Satow, moved in Banchō as the sixth British Minister to Japan from 1895 to 1900. The legation was upgraded to an embassy in 1905. The present building dates from 1929, after the Great Kanto Earthquake.

The area became a favorite for intellectuals, with multiple famous scholars and people of letters living in Banchō in the late XIXth, early XXth: Tōson Shimazaki, Kyōka Izumi, Yosano Akiko and her husband Tekkan Yosano, Tsuguharu Foujita and Rentarō Taki lived at one point in the area, a street crossing Banchō has been named . Educational facilities flourished, philosopher and politician Nakae Chōmin set up a French language school in 1874, later  along the Nishichidori ave., and Georges Ferdinant Bigot lived in the area as a teacher. In 1876, Sakurai Chika founded an English-speaking school for girls, the precursor of the Joshi Gakuin school. In 1917, the private needlework school for girls founded by Otsuma Kotaka in 1908 moved to Sanbanchō, and would later become Otsuma Women's University.

After the Great Kanto Earthquake, the Yasukuni Avenue was enlarged and redeveloped along the Kudan slope.

Modern Banchō
The area is primarily residential, with several renowned educational facilities (Otsuma Women's University, Tokyo Kasei-Gakuin University, Banchō Elementary School, Chiyoda International School Tokyo, Tokyo Chinese School, Kudan Elementary School, Joshi Gakuin Junior and Highschool, Hosei University...) several embassies (British, Israel, Tunisia, Luxemburg, Belgium, Timor-Leste, Apostolic Nunciature as well as the de facto embassy of DPRK), and a few offices and commercial facilities, notably along the Yasukuni Dori avenue and Nihon TV street avenues. The residences are mostly mid-sized multi-family buildings, with a handful individual houses.

Only a few large companies have their HQ in Banchō, most notably Seven & I Holdings Co. and Sony Music Entertainment.

Banchō is consistently ranked as the most exclusive and expensive residential area in Tokyo (and in Japan).

Renaming
In 1873, the area north of modern Yasukuni Dōri was split from former Sanbanchō and Yonbanchō to create Fujimichō. In 1933, the area along the Yasukuni Dōri Ave was renamed into Kudan. In 1938, the naming of the various districts of the area was shuffled. 
In 1966, Kudan was split in two, Kudankita north of the Yasukuni Dori ave, Kudanminami south of it.

The modern numbering of the six banchō bears little resemblance with the historical naming. As an example, Ichigaya station is located in modern Gobanchō, whereas the historical Gobanchō was around the location of the British Embassy.

Districts

Modern Banchō

Historical Banchō

Landmarks
Yasukuni Shrine
Chidorigafuchi National Cemetery
Hosei University
Otsuma Women's University
British Embassy Tokyo

See also
Banchō Sarayashiki

References

Chiyoda, Tokyo
Neighborhoods of Tokyo